Cardiocondyla emeryi is a species of ant in the subfamily Myrmicinae. There are two subspecies recognized. The type subspecies is found in numerous countries, through its large introduced range.

Subspecies
Cardiocondyla emeryi emeryi Forel, 1881
Cardiocondyla emeryi fezzanensis Bernard, 1948 - Algeria

Distribution
The species is distributed in Angola, Botswana, Cameroun, Colombia, Comoros, Ghana, Kenya, Mozambique, Nigeria, Rwanda, Saint Helena, Saudi Arabia, South Africa, Sudan, Tanzania, Uganda, United Arab Emirates, Yemen, Zimbabwe, Borneo, Cook Islands, Fiji, French Polynesia, Hawaii, Niue, Samoa, Tonga, Madagascar, Mauritius, Seychelles, United States, Bahamas, Barbados, Bermuda, Brazil, British Virgin Islands, Costa Rica, Cuba, Dominican Republic, Ecuador, Galapagos Islands, Haiti, Honduras, Mexico, Netherlands Antilles, Puerto Rico, Puerto Rico, Turks and Caicos Islands, Sri Lanka, Thailand, Vietnam, Canary Islands, Egypt, Iran, Israel, Spain and Switzerland.

References

External links

 at antwiki.org
PIAkey
Animaldiversity.org

Myrmicinae
Hymenoptera of Asia
Insects described in 1881